Jasper Garvida (born 3 January 1977) is a fashion designer. Born in the Philippines, he grew up in Canada before moving to London to study Fashion Design at Central St. Martins College of Art and Design. He established his eponymous fashion label in September 2008, known for its bold, highly embellished womenswear. Jasper has swiftly established his reputation as a unique luxury designer with an emphasis on tailoring and feminine silhouettes.

Garvida graduated from the prestigious Central St. Martins in 2004 with a BA honours in fashion design womenswear. His graduate collection Gala, Alice in Wonderland was reviewed by Hillary Alexander, fashion director of the Telegraph, as a “dazzling debut” and he was selected by ID magazine as “one of the young designers to watch out for”. The complete collection was bought by Nicola Formachetti, Editor of Dazed and Confused and was sold in Jingumae, Tokyo.

After graduation, Garvida took the opportunity to work with labels such as John Galliano, Alexander Mc Queen and Vivienne Westwood. Upon graduating, he swiftly gained the role of head designer for Michiko Koshino. In 2008 Garvida was named the winner of Project Catwalk.

In 2009 Garvida was a finalist for Fashion Fringe and debuted his first collection at London Fashion Week. Garvida is now runs his own fashion label Éthologie by Jasper Garvida,  a contemporary fashion brand that appeals to those who have a strong sense of individuality.' 

Most recent collections include; the pre-Spring/Summer '15 collection - Resort 2015, Spring/Summer '15 'Gradiva', Autumn/Winter '15 'Unity in Time and Space' and Spring/Summer '16 'When time stands still'. The Éthologie collections have been featured on Vogue UK, The Glass Magazine and have been exhibited at trade shows such as Paris Sur Mode, Zip Zone and Trace Paris showroom. Garvida also shows each season at London fashion week.

Jasper Garvida has exhibited his collection worldwide including Vienna, Toronto, Düsseldorf, London, Paris, and Tokyo. His A/W11 collection was showcased at the British Museum curated by Grayson Perry. The exhibition was formed by a series of images and interactive installation inspired by Harajuku girls. He presented  an installation of   a hundred models wearing his collections at the Natural History Museum, in the summer of 2010.

In 2013 Garvida was commissioned by the Baselworld (the luxury international watch and jewellery in Switzerland) to design, manufacture and supply outfits for the entire front of house team for the prestigious annual event. This included  30 haute couture garments for the principal reception team.

Garvida's designs have appeared in Vogue Italia, Russian Vogue, ELLE, i-D, V magazine, Dazed and Confused, The Telegraph, Grazia and other fashion publications. His garments have been seen on Katy Perry, Rhianna, Britney Spears, Folrence Welch, Lady Gaga, Elizabeth Hurley, Sophia Coppola, Pixie Lott, Jess Glynne, Cheryl Cole, Sophie Ellis-Bextor, Sugababes, The Saturdays, Girls Aloud and Helena Christensen, to name a few. Previous collections have graced the red carpets of high-profile events such as the Oscars, the Golden Globes, MTV Awards, Cannes Film Festival, Brit Awards and a plethora of other highly visible global events.

In May 2015 Garvida was presented with the Designer Innovation Award at the Luxury Law Summit. Garvida was also invited to appear at the Clothes Show Live event (Dec 2015) at the Birmingham NEC. Featuring an interview conducted by Hilary Alexander (fashion director at the Daily Telegraph) along with a catwalk presentation of the Éthologie Spring/Summer '16 collection.

References

External links
 

1977 births
Filipino fashion designers
Living people